The 2015 Liberty Flames football team represented Liberty University in the 2015 NCAA Division I FCS football season. They were led by fourth-year head coach Turner Gill and played their home games at Williams Stadium. They were a member of the Big South Conference. They finished the season 6–5, 3–3 in Big South play to finish in a tie for third place.

Schedule

Source: Schedule

Game summaries

Delaware State

@ West Virginia

Montana

@ Southern Illinois

@ Georgia State

@ Gardner–Webb

@ Monmouth

Kennesaw State

Presbyterian

@ Charleston Southern

Coastal Carolina

Ranking movements

References

Liberty
Liberty Flames football seasons
Liberty Flames football